Peter Ubavkić (12 April 1852 – 28 June 1910) was a Serbian sculptor and painter, recognized as the premier sculptor of Serbia, given the task to create a series of national monuments of which he authored many. He was a member of the Serbian Academy of Sciences and Arts.

Biography 
He was born in Belgrade on 12 April 1852. After completing high school (gymnasium), he received a state scholarship, and in 1866 he also studied iconography with an itinerant Italian artist, then living in Belgrade. He pursued his studies in art in Pančevo. In 1873 he went to Vienna to study sculpture. Owing to poor health, he returned to Belgrade. Upon receiving a new state scholarship he resumed his studies at the prestigious Kunstgewerbeschule in Munich in 1874.

According to some, he is considered the originator of Serbian sculpture. He has made numerous public monuments, among his best known works are busts of Vuk Karadžić, Prince Miloš and Đura Daničić.

Petar Ubavkić died in Belgrade on Vidovdan, 28 June 1910 and was buried in the New Cemetery.

Legacy
Today, Ubavkić is considered the premier Serbian sculptor in an age when art flourished to its maximum. He was indeed the creator of many public monuments at the time of the rule of Prince Miloš
Obrenović. Among his most important artistic works realized according to the cannons of realism or even verism, are the many Belgrade monuments executed by Ubavkić, including some in other regions of Serbia, particularly the monument to King Milan Obrenović in the Church of St. Paraskeve in Ćurlina.

Gallery

See also
 Đorđe Jovanović
 Simeon Roksandić
 Risto Stijović
 Sreten Stojanović

References 

3. Church of St. Paraskeve in Ćurlina: http://www.nisandbyzantium.org.rs/manastiri_i_crkve_grada_nisa/engleski/MONUMENT%20TO%20THE%20KING%20MILAN%20OBRENOVIC.html

External links 

 Biography online SANU
 Information on his grave
 Bust of Vuk Karadžić, the work of Peter Ubavkić

Serbian painters
Serbian sculptors
Male sculptors
1852 births
1910 deaths